The 7.5 cm Feldkanone 7M85 (7.5 cm FK 7M85) was a field gun used by Germany in World War II.

Design 
The FK 7M85 was designed to a requirement issued in 1944 for a dual-purpose anti-tank and field gun that could be produced quickly.  The gun, cradle and recoil system from the 7.5 cm PaK 40 anti-tank gun was adapted to the 10.5 cm leFH 18/40 carriage. The leFH 18/40 carriage had been itself adapted from the PaK 40 so this design essentially returned the carriage to its original gun, albeit with a wider range of ammunition and an extra 20° of elevation.

It is possible the FK 7M85 was influenced by the success of Soviet divisional guns such as M1936, M1939 and M1942 which the Germans captured in substantial numbers earlier in the war.  At  it was  heavier than the PaK 40,  heavier than the Soviet M1942 and  heavier than the 7.5 cm FK 16 nA which it would have replaced.  This would have made manhandling the FK 7M85 into position in snow and mud difficult.  However, the anti-tank performance of the 75 x 690 mm shell would have been greater than the 75 × 200 mm shell fired by the FK 16 NA or the 76.2 × 385 mm shell fired by the Soviet divisional guns.

Nomenclature 
In 1944–45 the Germans changed their system of artillery designations from the old "year" system. Each weapon was to have a number showing their caliber group, a letter denoting ammunition group, and the last two digits were from the weapon drawing number. In this case 7 denoted 75 mm caliber using the M group of ammunition. The shells were all to be designated as M with a 4-digit number, the first three were the drawing number and the last was the shell's category from the following list:

References 

 Engelmann, Joachim and Scheibert, Horst. Deutsche Artillerie 1934-1945: Eine Dokumentation in Text, Skizzen und Bildern: Ausrüstung, Gliederung, Ausbildung, Führung, Einsatz. Limburg/Lahn, Germany: C. A. Starke, 1974
 Gander, Terry and Chamberlain, Peter. Weapons of the Third Reich: An Encyclopedic Survey of All Small Arms, Artillery and Special Weapons of the German Land Forces 1939-1945. New York: Doubleday, 1979 
 Hogg, Ian V. German Artillery of World War Two. 2nd corrected edition. Mechanicsville, PA: Stackpole Books, 1997 

World War II field artillery
World War II artillery of Germany
75 mm artillery
Weapons and ammunition introduced in 1945